The Misuse of Drugs Act 1977, the Misuse of Drugs Act 1984, Misuse of Drugs Act 2015  and the Criminal Justice (Psychoactive Substances) Act 2010 are the acts of the Oireachtas regulating drugs in Ireland. The acts define the penalties for unlawful production, possession and supply of drugs.

In 2015 the 1977 act was declared unconstitutional, immediately legalizing many drugs in Ireland including ecstasy, ketamine, and crystal meth. The situation lasted 24 hours before emergency legislation closing the loophole could take effect.

Regulations 
The act provides for the Minister for Health to make regulations scheduling drugs according to their use perceived medical usability and their risk to the public. Additionally, these regulations outline the requirements for distribution and monitoring of the listed substances. The principal regulations are Misuse of Drugs Regulations 1988 (SI 328/1988) as amended by Misuse of Drugs (Amendment) Regulations 1993 (SI 342/1993), Misuse of Drugs (Amendment No. 1) Regulations 1999 (SI 273/1999), Misuse of Drugs (Amendment) Regulations 2006 (SI 53/2006), Misuse of Drugs (Amendment) Regulations 2007 (SI 200/2007), Misuse of Drugs (Amendment) (No. 1) Regulations 2009 (SI 63/2009), Misuse of Drugs (Amendment) (No. 2) Regulations 2009 (SI 122/2009) and Misuse of Drugs (Amendment) (No. 2) Regulations 2010 (SI 200/2010).

Schedule 1 
The substances (and certain derivatives thereof) considered by the state to have no medicinal or scientific value with consideration given regarding their likelihood of their being abused and thus would be considered illegal drugs.

Substances 

1-(1,3-Benzodioxol-5-yl)-2-(1-pyrrolidinyl)-pentanone (i.e. MDPV, added by 2010 Regulations)
1-Benzylpiperazine (added by 2010 Regulations, replacing '1-benzylpiperazinc (BZP)', added by 2009 Regulations)
Bufotenine
Cannabinol (except where contained in cannabis or cannabis resin)
Cannabinol derivatives
cannabis and cannabis resin (hashish)
Cathinone
Coca leaf
Concentrate of poppy-straw
[2,3–Dihydro–5–methyl–3–(4–morpholinylmethyl)pyrrolo[1, 2, 3–de]–1,4–benzoxazin–6–yl]–1–naphthalenylmethanone (i.e. WIN 55,212-2, added by 2010 Regulations)
3–Dimethylheptyl–11–hydroxyhexahydrocannabinol (i.e. canbisol, added by 2010 Regulations)
Eticyclidine
Etryptamine (added by 2010 Regulations)
1-(2-Fluorophenyl)-2-methylaminopropan-1-one (i.e. 2-FMC, added by 2010 Regulations)
1-(3-Fluorophenyl)-2-methylaminopropan-1-one (i.e. 3-FMC, added by 2010 Regulations)
1-(4-Fluorophenyl)-2-methylaminopropan-1-one (i.e. flephedrone, by 2010 Regulations)
9-(Hydroxymethyl)–6, 6–dimethyl–3–(2–methyloctan–2–yl)–6a, 7, 10, 10a–tetrahydrobenzo[c]chromen–1–ol (i.e. HU-210, added by 2010 Regulations)
[9–Hydroxy–6–methyl–3–[5–phenylpentan–2–yl] oxy–5, 6, 6a, 7, 8, 9, 10, 10a octahydrophenanthridin–1–yl] acetate (i.e. levonantradol, added by 2010 Regulations)
Khat (being the leaves of Catha edulis (Celastraceae)) (added by 1993 Regulations)
Lysergamide
Lysergide (and other N-alkyl derivatives of lysergamide) (i.e. LSD)
Mescaline
Methcathinone (added by 2010 Regulations)
1-(4-Methoxyphenyl)-2-(methylamino)propan-1-one (i.e. methedrone, added by 2010 Regulations)
2-Methylamino-1-(3,4-methylenedioxyphenyl)butan-1-one (i.e. butylone, added by 2010 Regulations)
2-Methylamino-1-(3,4-methylenedioxyphenyl)propan-1-one (i.e. methylone, added by 2010 Regulations)
4-(Methylthio)phenethylamine (i.e. 4-MTA, added by 2010 Regulations)
1-(4-Methylphenyl)-2-methylaminopropan-1-one (i.e. mephedrone, added by 2010 Regulations)
Psilocin
Raw opium
Rolicyclidine
Tenocyclidine
N,N-Diethyltryptamine
N,N-Dimethyltryptamine
N-(1-Benzyl-4-piperidyl)propionanilide
N-(1-(2-(2-Thienyl)ethyl)-4-piperidyl)propionanilide
2,5-Dimethoxy-α,4-dimethylphenethylamine
N-Hydroxytenamphetamine and 4-Methyl-aminorex (added by 1993 Regulations)

Schedule 2 
Strictly controlled medicinal products (and derivatives thereof) or drugs used for scientific purposes which have a high likelihood of their being abused. Exemptions are provided to cover legitimate use for professional purposes by doctors, pharmacists, vets etc. and in other specified circumstances.

Substances and products 

Acetorphine
Acetylmethadol
Alfentanil
Allylprodine
Alphacetylmethadol (i.e. levacetylmethadol)
Alphameprodine
Alphamethadol
Alphaprodine
Anileridine
Benzethidine
Benzylmorphine (3-benzylmorphine)
Betacetylmethadol
Betameprodine
Betamethadol
Betaprodine
Bezitramide
Carfentanil
Clonitazene
Cocaine
Codoxime
Desomorphine
Dextromoramide
Diampromide
Diethylthiambutene
Difenoxin
Dihydroetorphine (added by 2010 Regulations)
Dihydromorphine
Dimenoxadole (presumably Dimenoxadol)
Dimepheptanol
Dimethylthiambutene
Dioxaphetyl butyrate
Diphenoxylate
Dipipanone
Drotebanol
Ecgonine (and any derivative of ecgonine which is convertible to ecgonine or to cocaine)
Ethylmethylthiambutene
Etonitazene
Etorphine
Etoxeridine
Fentanyl
Furethidine
Heroin
Hydrocodone
Hydromorphinol
Hydromorphone
Hydroxypethidine
Isomethadone
Ketobemidone
Levomethorphan
Levomoramide
Levophenacylmorphan
Levorphanol
Lofentanil
Medicinal opium
Metazocine
Methadone
Methyldesorphine
Methyldihydromorphine (6-methyldihydromorphine)
Methylphenidate
Metopon
Morpheridine
Morphine
Morphine methobromide (morphine N-oxide and other pentavalent nitrogen morphine derivatives)
Myrophine
Nabilone
Nicomorphine
Noracymethadol
Norlevorphanol
Normethadone
Normorphine
Norpipanone
Oripavine (added by 2010 Regulations)
Oxycodone
Oxymorphone
Pethidine
Phenadoxone
Phenampromide
Phenazocine
Phencyclidine
Phenomorphan
Phenoperidine
Piminodine
Piritramide
Proheptazine
Properidine
Racemethorphan
Racemoramide
Racemorphan
Remifentanil (added by 2010 Regulations)
Sufentanil
Tapentadol (added by 2010 Regulations)
Thebacon
Thebaine
Tilidine
Trimeperidine
4-Cyano-2-dimethylamino-4,4-diphenylbutane
4-Cyano-1-methyl-4-phenylpiperidine
2-Methyl-3-morpholino-1,1-diphenylpropanecarboxylic acid
1-Methyl-4-phenylpiperidine-4-carboxylic acid
1-Phenylcyclohexylamine
4-Phenylpiperidine-4-carboxylic acid ethyl ester
4-(1-Phenylcyclohexyl)morpholine
1-Piperidinocyclohexanecarbonitrile
1-(1-(2-Thienyl)cyclohexyl)pyrrolidine
4-(1-(-2-Thienyl)cyclohexyl)morpholine

Substances 

Acetyldihydrocodeine
Amineptine (added by 2010 Regulations)
Amphetamine
Amphetaminil (added by 2010 Regulations)
Benzphetamine
Buprenorphine
Butorphanol
Codeine
Dexamphetamine
Dextropropoxyphene
Dihydrocodeine
Ethylmorphine (3-ethylmorphine)
Fenethylline
Glutethimide
Lefetamine
Mecloqualone
Methaqualone
Methylamphetamine
Methylphenidate
Nalbuphine
Nicocodine
Nicodicodine (6-nicotinoyldihydrocodeine)
Norcodeine
Phendimetrazine
Phenmetrazine
Pholcodine
Propiram
Quinalbarbitone
N-Ethylamphetamine
Zipeprol (added by 2010 Regulations)

Schedule 3 
Controlled medicinal products (and certain derivatives thereof) have a high likelihood of their being abused. Exemptions are provided to cover legitimate use for professional purposes by doctors, pharmacists, etc. and are frequently prescribed to the public for common ailments.

Substances 

Cathine
1-(3-Chlorophenyl)-4-(3-chloropropyl)piperazine (i.e. CCP, added by 2010 Regulations)
1-(3-Chlorophenyl)piperazine (i.e. mCPP, added by 2010 Regulations)
Chlorphentermine
Diethylpropion
Ethchlorvnol (presumably Ethchlorvynol)
Ethinamate
Flunitrazepam (moved up from Schedule 4 by 1993 Regulations)
4-Hydroxybutanoic acid (added by 1993 Regulations)
Ketamine (added by 2010 Regulations)
Mazindol
Mephentermine
Meprobamate
Methyprylone
Pemoline
Pentazocine
Phentermine
Pipradrol
Temazepam (moved up from Schedule 4 by 1993 Regulations)

Schedule 4 
Controlled medicinal products (and certain derivatives thereof).

Substances 

Alprazolam
Aminorex (added by 2010 Regulations)
Bromazepam
Brotizolam (added by 2010 Regulations)
Camazepam
Chlordiazepoxide
Clobazam
Clonazepam
Clorazepic Acid
Clotiazepam
Cloxazolam
Delorazepam
Diazepam
Estazolam
Ethyl loflazepate
Fencamfamin
Fenproporex
Fludiazepam
Flurazepam
Halazepam
Haloxazolam
Ketazolam
Loprazolam
Lorazepam
Lormetazepam
Medazepam
Mefenorex
Mesocarb (added by 2010 Regulations)
Midazolam (added by 1993 Regulations)
Nimetazepam
Nitrazepam
Nordazepam
Oxazepam
Oxazolam
Pinazepam
Prazepam
Propylhexedrine
Pyrovalerone
Selegiline (moved down from Schedule 2 by 1993 Regulations)
Tetrazepam
Triazolam
Zolpidem (added by 2010 Regulations)

Schedule 5 
Products containing a relatively small proportion of certain substances listed in schedules 1-4 (e.g. cough medicines containing codeine) and are usually administered by a doctor or pharmacist.

Schedule 8 
Schedule 8 (inserted by the 2007 Regulations) lists the drugs that can be prescribed by a registered nurse within schedules 2 and 3 for pain relief in hospitals, palliative care, midwifery and neonatal care in hospital and the particular method of administration of these drugs.

References

1977 in law
1984 in law
2010 in law
1977 in Ireland
1984 in Ireland
2010 in Ireland
1977 in Irish law
Acts of the Oireachtas of the 1970s
1984 in Irish law
Acts of the Oireachtas of the 1980s
2010 in Irish law
Acts of the Oireachtas of the 2010s
Drug control law